The women's doubles frontenis basque pelota event at the 2019 Pan American Games was held from 4–10 August at the Basque pelota courts in the Villa María del Triunfo Sports Center in Lima, Peru. The Mexican team won the gold medal, after defeating Cuba in the final.

Results

Preliminary round
The preliminary stage consisted of 2 pools, where every team played the other 2 teams in the same group once. At the end of this stage, the first four teams played in the semifinals and then the winning two played a final match for the gold medal, while the losing two teams played for bronze.

Pool A

All times are local (UTC−5)

Pool B

All times are local (UTC−5)

Semifinals

Bronze medal match

Gold medal match

References 

Women's doubles frontenis